Hillsborough Area Regional Transit (also known as the Hillsborough Transit Authority (HART)) provides public transportation for Hillsborough County, Florida. The agency provides fixed-route local and express bus service, door-to-door paratransit service (HARTplus), flex-route neighborhood connector service (HARTflex), a lightened version of bus rapid transit (MetroRapid), and manages the TECO Line Streetcar system.

Fares
 One-way fares on Local & Limited Express: $2.00
 One-way fares on Express: $3.00
 Unlimited one-day Local & Limited Express pass: $4.00
 Unlimited one-day Express pass: $6.00
 Unlimited 31 day Local & Limited Express pass: $65
 Unlimited 31 day Express pass: $95

HART fares listed above will be given a 50% discount if a proper HART ID card is present prier to purchase. 

HART has a partnership with the University of South Florida, where students can ride HART local, limited express, and flex routes for free if they show the bus operator their USF ID. USF Faculty & Staff can use the same services for only 50 cents

Bus and rail routes
HART currently operates 26 local bus and 7 express bus routes. In addition, the agency operates one heritage streetcar route (The TECO Streetcar), 5 HartFlex Van Routes, and the MetroRapid BRT line.

Local

Former Routes

Neighborhood Flex
HART provides the HART Flex Service consisting of commuter vans that have routes in designated areas. Walk-up service is provided at regular HART stops along the Flex service route, or patrons can reserve a pick-up or drop-off at a location not a HART stop by calling to reserve between 2 and 72 hours in advance. Walk-up service may be limited by the number of reservations. Fare is $1 per way, and an all-day flex pass available for $2. There is no discount available for seniors, Medicare or disabled as there are on other HART routes; however, up to 3 kids under 6 are free with fare-paying rider. Regular HART 1-Day and 31-Day passes are accepted. The service areas are typically 2.5 miles from a preset route, although at least one Flex area does not have a specific route.

HartFlex Routes
 571 - South County Flex - Bi-Direction from HCC Southshore Campus to La Estancia Apartments Guadalupe via Sun City Center.

Former HartFlex Routes
 570 - Brandon Flex -  Clockwise Loop from Westfield Brandon Mall to JC Handley PnR. Discontinued on January 24, 2021; partially replaced by extension of Route 38.
 572 - Northdale Flex - Bi-Direction from Fletcher Ave/Dale Mabry Hwy to St. Joseph's Hospital North via Dale Mabry Hwy. Discontinued on January 24, 2021; replaced by extension of Route 33.
 573 - Town ‘n Country Flex - Clockwise Loop From Northwest TC to Tampa Community Hospital. Discontinued on January 24, 2021.
 574 - South Tampa Flex - Counter Clockwise Loop from Britton Plaza to SSA - Frontage Rd/Laural St. Discontinued on January 24, 2021; replaced by restored Route 10 on Cypress Street; alternative service from Britton Plaza and Social Security/MacDonald is available on Route 36 and transfer to Route 30.

Commuter Express
In 2004, HART revised its express bus route system. The changes included new routes to Brandon and Pasco County, changes to existing routes (such as Route 28X), and the addition of 12 new Gillig BRT buses to the existing HART bus fleet. Almost all of the Commuter Express routes connected to Downtown Tampa. You can identify express routes by looking at the suffix letters at the end of the number (X means Express and LX means Limited Express). Some express routes operate on a Peak Direction schedule early morning and late afternoon. Others operate on an All-Day schedule. Due to changing ridership patterns, these routes were modified as needed. With the 2016 Mission MAX restructuring, Routes 21LX, 22X, 27LX, 28X, 47LX, 61LX, and 200X were all eliminated. Routes 60LX and 360LX were into service on the day Mission MAX was established. They’re also the first All-Day Limited Express Routes HART has established providing stops to Brandon, Downtown Tampa, Tampa Int’l Airport and South Tampa seven days a week. Route 275LX became the third All-Day Express Route replacing Route 51X serving Wiregrass, UATC, Downtown Tampa and TIA. There’s also talk about a NEW All-Day Express Route serving the Tampa Airport, Westshore, Downtown Tampa and Plant City. Although the official date of operation is unknown.

Former Routes

MetroRapid Service

MetroRapid is HART's "light" Bus Rapid Transit (BRT) service, which launched on May 28, 2013. Between May 28 and June 7, HART provided customers a chance to use MetroRapid for free. This allowed customers to get a feel for the new service, while allowing HART staff to work out any last-minute problems before the start of revenue service. MetroRapid officially began revenue service on June 10, 2013, with a formal ribbon cutting held at the Hidden River Corporate Park grounds in Tampa Palms.

MetroRapid currently consists of one line, the North-South line (numbered as Route 400), which runs from Downtown Tampa (MTC) to the University Area Transit Center (UATC) via Nebraska and Fletcher Avenues every day, every 15 minutes. It replaced Route 2.

TECO Line Streetcar System

This service is a 2.7-mile streetcar line that runs along Downtown Tampa, through the Channel District, and Ybor City. The system features historical replica streetcars of the original Tampa Streetcar Line. The TECO Line Streetcar is now FREE with extended morning and late night hours.

In its heyday, Tampa's streetcars whisked passengers to and from Ybor City, Ballast Point, Hyde Park, Sulphur Springs and points beyond. Operated by uniformed conductors, the Birney cars were a welcome sight, and the familiar clang of the streetcar bell was music to the ears. To ride the streetcar was to feel the pulse of the community.

Tampa's first electric streetcar lines built in 1892 quickly became an essential part of everyday life as workers took the streetcar downtown and to the cigar factories of west Tampa. And families climbed aboard for a picnic or ball game in DeSoto and Macfarlane parks. Reaching the peak of its popularity in the 1920s with almost 24 million passengers in 1926, Tampa's streetcar system rolled to a stop in August 1946 following World War II.

Today, electric streetcars are back in Tampa, supporting continued growth in Downtown, the Channel District and Ybor City. The TECO Line Streetcar System is a 2.7 mile section that connects these three areas, improving transportation capacity, supporting Tampa's thriving cruise industry and transporting workers to and from their jobs

Late-night service

In 2006, HART introduced late-night bus service on nine local bus routes in order to meet the diverse needs of its patrons. Some of these routes now run as late as 12 am as a result in the increase of service. Since 2007, the number of routes running weekday services beyond 8:00pm has increased to 16 routes.

Bus Terminals/Transit Centers

Like many transit agencies, HART has operated its bus system similar to a hub and spoke model. However, with system redesigns taking place in 2005 and 2017, the reliance on traditional hubs has lessened in favor of a grid-based system where transfers are done at key intersections and corridors. The main hub for HART is the Marion Transit Center in Downtown Tampa, serving 16 local and express routes (including PSTA's 100X and 300X) from 17 Bus Platforms (Platform A-N surrounding the station and the East, North and West Platforms), and also serves as stops for Megabus (Route M85) and RedCoach. The center was constructed in 2001, replacing the obsolete Northern Terminal, which sat underneath the I-275 viaduct. The Marion Transit Center includes a customer service center, office space, bus driver lounge, restrooms, bus shelters, and an array of public art displays and flanks the northern end of the Marion Street Transitway, which was constructed in 1989 as a "fare free" zone (though the designation was eliminated in 2008). Was under construction where the station is being resurfaced since November 4th, 2019 and completed construction on June 1st, 2020. Serving Routes 1, 5, 6, 7, 8, 9, 12, 19, 30, 20X, 60LX, 275LX, 360LX, PSTA Routes 100X and 300X, and the MetroRapid North-South Line. HARTPlus also serves the station since June 8th.

Other major bus terminals include:

University Area Transit Center: Constructed in the late 1990s and located in the USF area (within the quadrant of 131st Ave, Livingston Ave, N 27th St, and 132nd Ave), the UATC is the transfer point for 10 local bus routes. This facility includes bus shelters, restrooms, and a customer service center. Prior to the UATC's construction, HART spent several years juggling around several different locations as a transfer point in the University area, including University Mall. However, the University Mall plan failed to materialize due to financial problems and community opposition.   .. Serving Routes 1, 5, 6, 9, 12, 33, 42, 48, 275LX and the MetroRapid North-South Line.
NetPark Transfer Center: Located in east Tampa (off 56th Street and Hillsborough Ave), this facility is a transfer point for 8 local routes and includes restrooms, phones, and vending machines and will serve as a stop for HART's MetroRapid system. Serving Routes 6, 15, 32, 34, 37, 38, 39 and 48.

West Tampa Transfer Center: Located right next to Raymond James Stadium. Permanently closed following the Mission MAX system redesign in 2017. HART currently has no immediate intention to reactivate the hub and could sell the land in the distant future for redevelopment if longer-term plans deem it necessary to do so. During the Tampa Bay Buccaneers home games, the station will be open for HART MVP Express which operate for $10 round trip. Northbound trips on Routes 32, 36 and 45 have closest bus stops to provide entrance to Raymond James while Route 7 has stops on MLK Blvd/Himes Ave when events are available (Effective 8/16/2019)
Northwest Transfer Center: Located on the corner of Sheldon Road and Waters Ave, the Northwest Transfer Center replaced the makeshift bus depot at Hanley/Waters Plaza. Construction began in the spring of 2007 and was dedicated/opened to patrons July 29, 2008 . The new facility is equipped with vending machines, restrooms for both patrons and employees, an adjacent park-n-ride lot and 4 local bus routes, and eight bus loading bays. Serving Routes 16, 34, 35, 39, Town-N-Country FLEX service, and the PSTA Tampa/Oldsmar Flex Connector.
Tampa International Airport Rental Car Facility Bus Hub: Located on the grounds of TPA Airport, adjacent to the new Rental Car Facility, five bus loading bays along a straightaway drive allows for loading and unloading of transit buses, with future expansion in mind. Customers can easily connect to and from the airport terminal via SkyConnect. Serving Routes 30, 32, 35, 60LX, 275LX, and PSTA Route 300X.

Secondary Bus Terminals
WestShore Plaza - WestShore Business District: Routes 15, 45, and South Tampa FLEX.
Britton Plaza - South Tampa/Interbay: Routes 17, 19, 36, 360LX, South Tampa FLEX, and PSTA Route 100X.
SouthShore Regional Service Center - SouthShore/Ruskin: Routes 31 and SouthShore FLEX.
Westfield Brandon - Brandon: Routes 8, 31, 37, 46, 75LX, and Brandon FLEX.
Yukon Transfer Center - Sulphur Springs: Routes 14, 16, 42, and 45.

The Marion Street Transitway
Constructed in the 1980s, the Marion Street Transitway provides a line of bus shelters along the street to allow patrons to easily board and deboard buses within Downtown Tampa. The transitway runs from the Marion Transit Center to Whiting Street and was originally a "fare-free" zone until 2008. All of the shelters along the transitway were equipped with departure time signage at one time, allowing patrons to view when the next bus would arrive. Such technology in the past have malfunctioned and were removed as a result. The remaining "shells" of this signage will eventually be removed as well, being replaced with new technology.

Awards
In 2009, the Florida Public Transit Association awarded HART with the "Outstanding System" award. The award was granted to HART based on numerous system improvements and growing ridership over the past three years. The FPTA also awarded HART in several other categories including marketing, safety, and Mechanic of the Year. 

On May 27, 2010, HART announced that they have been awarded the 2010 "Most Outstanding Mid-sized Public Transportation System Achievement" Award. The award touts HART's achievements in ridership growth, financial management, environmental sustainability, workforce development, and community relations.  The American Public Transportation Association honors one public transportation system in North America in three size categories every year. Systems are judged on their performance over a 3-year period.

Budget cuts and system reorganization (2007 through 2011)
Like many local agencies throughout Florida, HART was forced in 2007 to cut its budget by $1.7 million. As a result of this, HARTflex service was canceled and numerous routes saw drawbacks in service. Limited Express Route 52 and Trolley Route 98 were eliminated due to low ridership.

During the 2009/2010 fiscal year, HART slashed another $3 million from its budget in order to compensate for additional property tax revenue losses. This move was achieved by trimming service in Town-N-Country and North Tampa, as well as cutting underutilized trips on numerous routes .

To counteract plummeting property tax revenues, HART proposed to switch to a sales tax-based system which many other transit agencies in Florida already use. However, this proposal requires voter approval and the chances of such a move passing during the nationwide recession is extremely low. HART and Hillsborough County attempted to pass such a measure during the 2010 election season, but it failed by a 58/42% margin .

Despite drawbacks caused by state and county mandated budget cuts and the global recession, HART is striving to improve transit service in the future by managing existing service while only cutting under-performing service and gradually raising fares. HART's 2008 Community Report outlined several key changes, such as the introduction of HARTflex service and the upcoming MetroRapid system.

Since 2010, a majority of HART's routes have been realigned to better serve patrons throughout the county. These changes included eliminating inefficient segments and trips, realigning travel times, and adding services that would better serve patrons in the long term. Several under-performing routes (such as Neighborhood Connector routes 87, 88, and 89) were eliminated in favor of neighboring transit routes, HARTflex service, or (in the case of Route 59LX) by improved services (Route 61LX). HART also began testing a limited stop route, Route 6LTD, to replace Route 23X.

Mission MAX (2017-2020 System-wide Restructuring)

With many fiscal impacts looming to negatively impact HART's future plans and budgeting - including, but no limited to: reducing the size of the agency's debts, preparing for possible reductions in property tax revenues and federal transit funding support, and the national trend of declining transit ridership - the agency announced in early 2017 that it would launch a Comprehensive Operational Analysis (COA) of the entire system as part of its next Transit Development Plan (TDP) update. This analysis allowed HART to essentially evaluate every route in the system to see which ones can be improved and which ones would have to be eliminated based on ridership levels and demand. Public outreach began during the spring of 2017 and continued through the summer - eventually leading up to the announcement of a system-wide restructuring effort called Mission MAX, which focuses on modernizing the system to operate with less reliance on traditional transfer hubs and more on a grid system, shorten travel times on key core routes, eliminate out-of-direction travel, and provide more direct service to key destinations. Mission MAX will also provide HART with the foundation that it needs to better analyze and execute future expansion endeavors .

Plans
HART has the following projects planned to begin service within the next five years.

West Shore Multi-Modal Center
HART and the Hillsborough County Aviation Authority have been discussing plans to build a transfer center at Tampa International Airport since 2008. Originally, the facility was to be located at the corner of O'Brien and Spruce streets  but was dropped in 2011 in favor of a site closer to the TIA terminal.  Plans for any type of transfer center on TIA property collapsed in 2012 following the impact of global economic downturn and the consolidation of the airline industry on TIA's broad terminal expansion plans. In March, 2013, plans were unveiled for a possible Multi-Modal center along Interstate 275 in the WestShore Business District that could cater to multiple bus connections, light rail or commuter rail lines, and a People Mover system connecting the airport. This plan is heavily dependent on whether public transit in both Hillsborough and Pinellas counties are able to further expand. This in-turn, would be dependent on future funding situations . As of 2020, the multi-modal center remains a part of the Florida Department of Transportation's Tampa Bay NEXT interstate-based transportation plan.

Intelligent Transportation Systems
According to HART's 2008 Community Report, efforts are currently underway to construct an intelligent transportation system (ITS). Elements of this project include installing surveillance cameras and audio monitoring equipment, GPS systems, automated annunciator systems, real-time information display signs and other elements to all HART buses and several transfer centers. Such systems will allow patrons in the future to see in real-time, upcoming departures, major intersections, landmarks, and connecting routes. Many of these elements, including GPS, security, and automated annunciator systems were installed during the course of 2008 through 2010.

Bus fleet reorganization/improvements

Another improvement to HART's existing bus fleet is the repainting of buses to better match the livery that is already carried by Commuter Express buses. However, instead of the purple and white livery of the express buses, local buses are being repainted in a blue and white scheme (matching the colors of HART's logo). Bus #2015 was the first bus to be painted in the new colors, returning to service in August 2008, upon the receipt of federal stimulus funds in 2009, HART accelerated the repainting process, allowing more buses to sport the new livery.

In 2008, the agency acquired 12 25-foot Champion/Freightliner T-300 buses (from Dallas Area Rapid Transit) to be used on the fixed-route system while its existing fleet was repainted. These buses were retired in March and April 2010, with the arrival of the 29 40-foot 2010 model (10XX) Gillig Low Floor buses.

Beginning in August 2009, HART retired its fleet of Gillig Phantom buses, which the agency purchased in 1996 and 1997 to replace Flxible Metro buses purchased during the 1980s. These buses were replaced by 30 2009 model (29XX) year  Gillig Low Floor buses that were purchased with the help of federal stimulus funds. Although seven of the  Phantoms were already taken out of service in 2007, HART kept three (#s 602, 608, and 609) in service beyond that time. By mid September, 2009, all of the  Gillig Phantom buses were retired, along with most of the  models. The final nine buses that were phased out during the week of September 30, 2009 included #s 703, 708, 711, 713, 717, 720, 723, 725, and 726, with #725 being featured at HART's 30th Anniversary Ceremony on September 30.

In 2010, HART retired all but two of its 2000 model (20XX) 30 ft Gillig buses after the arrival of the 10XX Gillig fleet. Bus #2005 and #2015 (which were repainted in HART's new livery) will remain active until 2012, due to extended downtime earlier on in 2008/2009. In 2009, bus #2006 was retired due to an accident that permanently put it out of service. During the summer and fall of 2010, the 25XX and 26XX buses were all repainted in HART's blue and white livery. The MetroRapid system will bring forth another fleet of new buses, including the possibility of articulated buses further down the road.

In 2014, HART began purchasing Compressed Natural Gas (CNG) transit buses, along with a small fleet of CNG powered paratransit vans. In total as of 2020, there are 70 CNG powered buses in the fleet, though one (# 1708) was retired earlier in the year due to severe accident damage.

In 2020, the agency received a $2.7 million dollar federal grant to purchase 4 electric buses . These buses are expected to be on the road by 2022, though it is unclear which manufacturer will be selected to produce them.

American Reinvestment and Recovery Act of 2009
HART is slated to receive just over $15 million from the American Reinvestment and Recovery Act of 2009 that President Barack Obama signed into law in February 2009. Among the improvements that HART proposed to make: an expansion and upgrade to its operations facility in Ybor City, secure the purchase of 30 forty-foot Gillig Low Floor buses, streetcar extension, and the repainting of HART's existing fleet.

Conversion to Compressed Natural Gas (CNG)
In November, 2011, HART was awarded a $2.3 million federal grant to build a CNG fueling station at its operations facility. This will allow all of HART's existing fleet to gradually be replaced by CNG fueled vehicles. Construction is slated to begin sometime in 2012, with completion in 2013 .

TRANSitFORMATION
In September 2019, HART has several plans for the future of transportation in Hillsborough County under the hashtag #TRANSitFORMATION. Some of these plans include improvements and added services on select routes, more detailed information and improvements in bus shelters, adding electric bus pilots to their fleet and replacing select gas/diesel fuel buses, adding more Bus Rapid Transit (BRT) routes along Florida Ave, Nebraska Ave and Fowler Ave. also, HART has planned future commuter passenger rail or high speed rail transport across Hillsborough and its neighboring counties among the CSX rail corridor and possible future extensions for the TECO Streetcar Line.

Active fleet
As of November 2010, all local/express HART buses are in the blue and white livery (except if the bus has an advertisement like Morgan & Morgan, 1-800-411-PAIN, etc. Or if some units have special liveries to support the Tampa Bay Buccaneers or the Tampa Bay Lightning). Trolley buses are in a similar pale blue/white livery, and MetroRapid buses are in a green/gray/white livery. (As Of May 2019 Only Some MetroRapid Units are in the MetroRapid Livery.) Since the May 2019 incident, most buses have protection driver doors to protect it's operator from future offenses.

Retired fleet

References

HART's 2006/2007 proposed fare and service changes A list of service and fare changes that will encompass FY 2006/2007.
HART To Take Riders From Door To Store Tampa Tribune - January 29, 2007.
Hillsborough County to start door-to-door bus service Bay News 9 - 4/3/07.
HART To Scale Back Service Tampa Tribune - June 24, 2007.
Bus systems roll with cuts St. Petersburg Times - July 8, 2007.
MetroRapid project information - www.goHART.org
HARTflex Information - www.goHART.org

External links
GoHART Official Site
TECO Line Streetcar System
Why Transit? from goHART.org
Tampa Bay Transit

 
1980 establishments in Florida